The 2003 Tirreno–Adriatico was the 38th edition of the Tirreno–Adriatico cycle race and was held from 13 March to 19 March 2003. The race started in Sabaudia and finished in San Benedetto del Tronto. The race was won by Filippo Pozzato of the Fassa Bortolo team.

General classification

References

2003
2003 in Italian sport